Roy Mitchell (born  March 14, 1969) is a Canadian former professional ice hockey player who played three games in the National Hockey League for the Minnesota North Stars.

Career statistics

External links

1969 births
Living people
Canadian ice hockey defencemen
Ice hockey people from Edmonton
Minnesota North Stars players
Montreal Canadiens draft picks
Edmonton Sled Dogs players
Portland Winterhawks players
Sherbrooke Canadiens players
Central Texas Stampede players